Jesús 'Chus' Hevia Martín (born 11 May 1990) is a Spanish manager and former footballer who played mainly as a left winger. 

He is the manager of Gijón Industrial youth since 2020.

Club career
Born in Oviedo, Asturias, Hevia started playing as a senior with Recreativo de Huelva B in the 2009–10 season, in Tercera División, after playing youth football with Real Madrid and Villarreal CF. On 13 June of the following year he made his first-team debut, coming on as a second-half substitute in a 1–0 home success over FC Cartagena, in the Segunda División championship.

On 12 January 2012 Hevia rescinded his link with the Andalusians, signing with Real Oviedo and being assigned to the B-side also in the fourth level. On 26 June he signed with Marino de Luanco, in Segunda División B.

On 28 June 2014, after scoring a ten goals in the 2013–14 campaign, Hevia moved to another club in the third level, FC Cartagena. On 13 July of the following year he joined fellow league team Racing de Santander.

In August 2018, after a serious knee lesion, Hevia retired as footballer and started his manager career at Marbella FC.

References

External links

1990 births
Living people
Footballers from Oviedo
Spanish footballers
Association football wingers
Segunda División players
Segunda División B players
Tercera División players
Atlético Onubense players
Recreativo de Huelva players
Real Oviedo Vetusta players
Marino de Luanco footballers
FC Cartagena footballers
Racing de Santander players
Linares Deportivo footballers
Marbella FC players
Spanish football managers